Mai Chisamba (born Rebecca Tsirikirayi, 21 October 1952), is a Zimbabwean businesswoman and talk show host.

Early life 
Chisamba was born in Bindura, Zimbabwe, in a family of seven. She attended Bindura Salvation Army Primary School before attending Usher Girls High in Matabeleland. Chisamba received teacher training at Howard Institute.

Career  
Chisamba was a teacher and she became a radio teacher under the Ministry of Education Sports and Culture, through the encouragement of her then headmaster, Mr. Douglas Sanyahungwe. She was invited for auditions at ZBC through the ministry and she ended up hosting her own show on the national broadcaster. That is how she made her debut as a television personality. She is known for hosting The Mai Chisamba Show, a popular talk show on ZBC TV. Chisamba's show talks about many issues, which includes health, marriage, sexual relationships and more. She was the only Zimbabwean hosting a Shona language  talk show in the days that the English language was dominant in Zimbabwe.

Mai Chisamba

She also has a newspaper column to which people can send letters on marital issues and social issues.

In 2018 she was made the domestic tourism ambassador by the Zimbabwe Tourism Authority and the same year she headlined her show in Birmingham.

She is also a philanthropist, helping raise funds for and donating goodies to the less fortunate. She is a supporter of the Maunganidze Children's home in Chitungwiza.

Personal life 
Rebecca is married and has 5 children and several grandchildren. One of her daughters, Gamuchirai Chisamba works on the Mai Chisamba show as a Graphic Designer.

Awards and honors 
Chisamba has won various national awards, including:

References

External links 
Mention in the Parliament of Zimbabwe
Video clip of the Mai Chisamba Show

1952 births
Living people
People from Bindura
Zimbabwean television people